The Baylè Pistol was a 6 barrel pistol of French origin introduced in 1879. The barrels were stacked vertically and firing was actuated with a double-action trigger mechanism firing each round at a time.

References

External links
Auction website with several photographs of the pistol

See also
Guns and Hunting, September 1962
Shooting Times, December 1962

Multiple-barrel firearms
Firearms of France